Keda Cone, sometimes mistakenly called Kena Cone, is a cinder cone in northwestern British Columbia, Canada, located in the Snowshoe Lava Field of Mount Edziza Provincial Park. It last erupted during the Holocene epoch.

See also
List of volcanoes in Canada
List of Northern Cordilleran volcanoes
Volcanism of Canada
Volcanism of Western Canada

References

External links

Cinder cones of British Columbia
Holocene volcanoes
Monogenetic volcanoes
Mount Edziza volcanic complex
One-thousanders of British Columbia